Fredrick William Rouse (28 November 1881 – December 1953) was an English professional footballer who played as a centre forward in the Football League for Chelsea, Everton, Grimsby Town, Stoke and West Bromwich Albion. He also represented the Football League XI.

Club career
A centre forward, Rouse was born in Cranford and played for London clubs Southall, Wycombe Wanderers, Brentford and Shepherds Bush, before moving north to join First Division club Grimsby Town in 1903. Despite suffering relegation to the Second Division at the end of the 1902–03 season, he impressed at the "Mariners" and earned a move to division rivals Stoke in April 1904. Rouse top-scored for the team with 12 and 10 goals during the 1904–05 and 1905–06 seasons respectively. In November 1906, financial concerns led to his sale to First Division club Everton for a £600 fee. Rouse struggled to settle at Goodison Park and returned to London to join First Division club Chelsea for a £1000 fee. After two seasons at Stamford Bridge, Rouse dropped down to the Second Division to play the 1909–10 season with West Bromwich Albion and later played for Croydon Common, Brentford and Slough.

Representative career 
Rouse represented the Football League XI in matches versus the Irish League XI in October 1905 and October 1906, scoring once a 6–0 victory in the latter match.

Personal life 
After his retirement from football, Rouse became publican of the Coach & Horses pub at Hayes Bridge.

Career statistics

Honours 
Wycombe Wanderers
 Berks & Bucks Senior Cup: 1901–02

References

English footballers
Brentford F.C. players
Chelsea F.C. players
Everton F.C. players
Grimsby Town F.C. players
Shepherd's Bush F.C. players
Stoke City F.C. players
West Bromwich Albion F.C. players
Wycombe Wanderers F.C. players
English Football League players
1881 births
1953 deaths
English Football League representative players
Slough Town F.C. players
Southall F.C. players
Croydon Common F.C. players
Southern Football League players
Association football forwards